Rajiv Ivan (born 4 September 1986) is a Guyanese cricketer. He played in two List A matches for Guyana in 2013.

See also
 List of Guyanese representative cricketers

References

External links
 

1986 births
Living people
Guyanese cricketers
Guyana cricketers